"Living Dangerously" is a song by Australian recording artist Dami Im. It was written by Im, Liz Webber
and Jon Hume, and produced by Hume. The song was released on 9 October 2014, as the third and final single from Im's third studio album Heart Beats.

On the 25 October 2014, Im performed the song at Macau, China during the non-competitive 2014 ABU TV Song Festival.

Reception
Mike Wass of Idolator described "Living Dangerously" as a "gorgeous pop anthem", further complimenting it saying "the soaring anthem is the perfect vehicle for Dami's powerful pipes.". Asif Mumtaz of All Noise said "Dami's powerful vocals are perfect for "Living Dangerously" as she soars above the electronic beat to fill up the track with life. She even sets fire to the chorus through her emotional execution."

Promotion
On 18 October 2014, Im performed "Gladiator" and "Living Dangerously" at the 26th annual Australian Commercial Radio Awards. Im performed "Living Dangerously" on Sunrise on 23 October 2014.

Release history

References

2014 songs
2014 singles
Dami Im songs
Songs written by Dami Im
Songs written by Jon Hume
Sony Music Australia singles